David Vaněček (born 25 July 1983) is a former professional Czech football player and current manager. He is the cousin of another David Vaněček; they played together at Sokolov.

References

External links
 Profile at FKSokolov.cz

Czech footballers
1983 births
Living people
Czech First League players
FC Viktoria Plzeň players
FK Mladá Boleslav players
FK Baník Sokolov players
Association football midfielders
Czech National Football League players